Jesse LaVercombe is a Canadian-American actor and writer. He is most noted for his performance in the film Violation, for which he won the ACTRA Award for Best Actor in 2021 and received a Canadian Screen Award nomination for Best Supporting Actor at the 9th Canadian Screen Awards.

Education 
LaVercombe is an alumnus of the National Theatre School of Canada and the Canadian Film Centre.

Career 
LaVercombe has also appeared in the films Mary Goes Round, The Things You Think I'm Thinking, Queen of the Morning Calm, and Flowers of the Field, and has had guest roles in the television series Save Me, American Gods, The Detail, and Murdoch Mysteries. As a writer, he wrote the screenplay for The Things You Think I'm Thinking, and won the Playwrights Guild of Canada's RBC Emerging Playwright award in 2019 for his theatrical play Hallelujah, It’s Holly.

Filmography

Film

Television

References

External links

21st-century Canadian male actors
21st-century Canadian male writers
21st-century Canadian dramatists and playwrights
21st-century Canadian screenwriters
Canadian male film actors
Canadian male television actors
Canadian male stage actors
Canadian male dramatists and playwrights
Male actors from Toronto
Writers from Toronto
National Theatre School of Canada alumni
Canadian Film Centre alumni
Living people
Year of birth missing (living people)